Life Begins at Forty is a 1932 self-help book by Walter B. Pitkin.

Life Begins at Forty may also refer to:

Film and TV
Life Begins at 40 (film), a 1935 American film starring Will Rogers
Life Begins at Forty (2003 TV series), a TVB series in Cantonese which aired from 2003 to 2004
 Life Begins at Forty (1978 TV series) , a Yorkshire Television sitcom starring Derek Nimmo, which aired from 1978 to 1980

Music
"Life Begins at 40" (song), a song by John Lennon
"Life Begins at Forty", a 1937 song by	Sophie Tucker
"Life Begins at Forty" (song), a 1983 song from Dave and the Dynamos